Cyclostrema huesonicum, common name the Key West cyclostreme, is a species of sea snail, a marine gastropod mollusk in the family Liotiidae.

Description
The height of the shell attains 4.5 mm.

Distribution
This marine species occurs off the Florida Keys, USA, at a depth of 165 m to 174 m.

References

 Dall, W. H. 1927. Diagnoses of undescribed new species of mollusks in the collection of the United States National Museum. Proceedings of the United States National Museum 70 (2668): 1–11.
 Rosenberg, G., F. Moretzsohn, and E. F. García. 2009. Gastropoda (Mollusca) of the Gulf of Mexico, Pp. 579–699 in Felder, D.L. and D.K. Camp (eds.), Gulf of Mexico–Origins, Waters, and Biota. Biodiversity. Texas A&M Press, College Station, Texas

huesonicum
Gastropods described in 1927